The 1996–97 Illinois State Redbirds men's basketball team represented Illinois State University during the 1996–97 NCAA Division I men's basketball season. The Redbirds, led by fourth year head coach Kevin Stallings, played their home games at Redbird Arena and were a member of the Missouri Valley Conference.

The Redbirds finished the season 24–6, 14–4 in conference play to finish in first place. They were the number one seed for the Missouri Valley Conference tournament. They won their quarterfinal game versus Indiana State University, semifinal game versus the University of Northern Iowa, and final game versus Southwest Missouri State University to earn the championship title.

The Redbirds received the conference automatic bid to the 1997 NCAA Division I men's basketball tournament. They were assigned to the Midwest Regional as the number eleven seed where they lost to Iowa State University in the first round.

Roster

Schedule

|-
!colspan=9 style=|Regular Season

|-
!colspan=9 style=|Missouri Valley Conference {MVC} tournament

|-
!colspan=9 style=|National Collegiate Athletic Association {NCAA} tournament

References

Illinois State Redbirds men's basketball seasons
Illinois State
Illinois State